The Milwaukee County Executive serves as the chief executive officer of Milwaukee County, Wisconsin.  Vested with veto power and appointing authority over department heads, the county executive oversees the administrative functions of county government and carries out ordinances passed by the Milwaukee County Board of Supervisors.  The county executive is elected to a four-year term; there are no term limits.  Vacancies in the office are filled temporarily by the chairman of the County Board, who may personally appoint an interim county executive until such time as a special election may be held.  The office of county executive was created in 1960; executive functions were consolidated under the office during the tenure of County Executive Bill O'Donnell.  Prior to 1960, the County Board and its chairman conducted county administration unilaterally.

County executives
 John Doyne (1960–1976)
 William O'Donnell (1976–1988)
 Dave Schulz (1988–1992)
 Tom Ament (1992–2002)
 Karen Ordinans (acting) (2002)
 Janine Geske (interim) (2002)
 Scott Walker (April 30, 2002December 27, 2010)
 Lee Holloway, (acting) (December 27, 2010February 4, 2011)
 Marvin Pratt (interim) (February 4, 2011April 25, 2011)
 Chris Abele (April 25, 2011May 4, 2020)
 David Crowley (May 4, 2020present)

References

Government of Milwaukee County, Wisconsin
Milwaukee County Executive
 
Executives